Tommy Lowry (26 August 1945 – 22 August 2015) was an English professional footballer who played as a defender, at right back, for Liverpool and Crewe Alexandra.

He joined Liverpool in 1961, and signed professional forms in 1963, before making his only first team appearance in a 3–1 win at Wolverhampton Wanderers in the final game of the season on 26 April 1965. He left Liverpool after his contract expired in 1966, and joined Crewe. He made his debut in a 1-0 win over Southend United at Gresty Road on 22 October 1966. Lowry scored twice for Crewe, both against Brentford at Gresty Road, on 23 September 1970 and on 15 March 1975.

He made a record 481 league and cup appearances for Crewe Alexandra, beating a record set by former team-mate Peter Leigh, and making his final appearance away at Scunthorpe United on 23 August 1977. After retiring from football, he worked at Rolls-Royce in Crewe for over 25 years.

Honours
with Crewe Alexandra
Football League Fourth Division fourth-place promotion: 1967–68

References

External links
 LFC History profile

1945 births
2015 deaths
Footballers from Liverpool
English footballers
Association football defenders
Liverpool F.C. players
Crewe Alexandra F.C. players
English Football League players